The 2001 Coca-Cola GM was the 31st edition of the Greenlandic Men's Football Championship. The final round was held in Sisimiut. It was won by Nagdlunguaq-48 for the eighth time in its history.

Qualifying stage

North Greenland

Disko Bay

Central Greenland

East Greenland
A.T.A.-60 qualified for the South Greenland Round.

South Greenland

Final round

Pool 1

Pool 2

Playoffs

Semi-finals

Seventh-place match

Fifth-place match

Third place match

Final

See also
Football in Greenland
Football Association of Greenland
Greenland national football team
Greenlandic Men's Football Championship

References

Greenlandic Men's Football Championship seasons
Green
Green
Foot